Adair County is a county located in the U.S. state of Oklahoma. As of the 2010 census, the population was 22,286. Its county seat is Stilwell. Adair County was named after the Adair family of the Cherokee tribe. One source says that the county was specifically named for Watt Adair, one of the first Cherokees to settle in the area.

History
The county was created in 1906 from the Goingsnake and Flint districts of the Cherokee Nation. There was a decade-long struggle over what town would become the county seat between Stilwell and Westville. When the county was formed, Westville was identified as the county seat, due partly to its location at the intersection of two major railroads: the Kansas City Southern Railway and the St. Louis – San Francisco Railway. The county seat was moved to Stilwell in 1910.

During the Great Depression and World War II, strawberries became a major crop in Adair County. In 1948, the first Stilwell Strawberry Festival was organized. The 2002 festival saw some 40,000 people in attendance.

The 1910 census counted 10,535 residents. By 1990, it was up to 18,421.

Geography

The county is part of the Ozark plateau uplift, the tree-covered foothills of the Boston Mountains. North and central Adair County are drained by the Illinois River and three creeks. Two more creeks lie near Stilwell.

Major highways
  U.S. Highway 59
  U.S. Highway 62
  State Highway 51

Adjacent counties
 Delaware County (north)
 Benton County, Arkansas (northeast)
 Washington County, Arkansas (east)
 Crawford County, Arkansas (southeast)
 Sequoyah County (south)
 Cherokee County (west)

National protected area
 Ozark Plateau National Wildlife Refuge

Demographics

As of the census of 2010, Adair County had a small population relative to its surrounding counties, with only 21,038 people, a large percentage of them, 43.3 percent, Native American. The remainder of the population was 43 percent white, 10.5 percent of more than one race, and 5.3 percent Hispanic or Latino. Less than 1 percent of the population was either Black or African American, Asian, or Pacific Islander, and 2.3 percent were identified as other. This makes it the only majority-minority county in Oklahoma. Adair county had a higher percentage of Native Americans (American Indians) in its population than any other Oklahoma county.

The median age of the population was 36.2 years and two-thirds of the county's population were either under the age of 18 (28 percent) or between the ages of 25 to 44 (24.8 percent). Of the remaining population, 25.9 percent were ages 45 to 64, 12.9 percent were 65 years of age or older, and 13.2 percent were ages 18 to 24. For every 100 females there were 100.1 males. For every 100 females age 18 and over, there were 98.3 males.

There were a total of 8,156 households and 5,982 families in the county in 2010. There were 9,142 housing units. Of the 8,156 households, 31.4 percent included children under the age of 18 and slightly more than half (52.7 percent) included married couples living together. 26.7 percent were non-family, 14.2 percent had a female householder with no husband present, and 26.8 percent contained a single individual of 65 years of age or older. The average household size was 2.77 and the average family size was 3.25.

The median income for a household in the county was $27,258, and the median income for a family was $32,930. Males had a median income of $28,370 versus $23,384 for females. The per capita income for the county was $13,560. About 25.3 percent of families and 27.8 percent of the population were below the poverty line, including 36.8 percent of those under age 18 and 18.7 percent of those age 65 or over.

Politics

While Adair County has a majority of Democrats among its registered voters, it is unusual as an example of a majority-minority county that votes Republican. No Democrat has won Adair County since Jimmy Carter in 1976.

Economy
The county is home to food processing and canning industries; poultry farms; cattle ranches; horse breeders; dog breeders, and strawberry fields.

Communities

Cities
 Stilwell (county seat)

Towns
 Watts
 Westville

Census-designated places

 Baron
 Bell
 Bunch
 Cave Spring
 Chance
 Cherry Tree
 Chewey
 Christie
 Elm Grove
 Elohim City
 Fairfield
 Greasy
 Honey Hill
 Lyons Switch
 Marietta
 Mulberry
 Old Green
 Peavine
 Piney
 Proctor
 Rocky Mountain
 Salem
 Titanic
 Watts Community (former)
 Wauhillau
 West Peavine
 Zion

Other unincorporated places
 Ballard
 Lyons

NRHP sites

The following sites in Adair County are listed on the National Register of Historic Places:
 Adair County Courthouse, Stilwell
 Breadtown, Westville vicinity
 Ballard Creek Roadbed, Westville vicinity
 Buffington Hotel, Westville
 Golda's Mill, Stilwell
 Opera Block, Westville
 Rev. Jesse Bushyhead Grave, Westville

References

External links
 Encyclopedia of Oklahoma History and Culture - Adair County
 Oklahoma Digital Maps: Digital Collections of Oklahoma and Indian Territory
 Oklahoma Almanac, 2005 - Adair County

 
1907 establishments in Oklahoma
Populated places established in 1907